Billingsfors IK is a Swedish football club located in Billingsfors, close to Bengtsfors, Västra Götaland County.

Background
Billingsfors Idrottsklubb was founded on 26 May 1906 and played one season in the Allsvenskan, the highest Swedish league, in 1946–47. BIK were relegated at the end of the season, finishing bottom of the table with just three draws. While the club is positioned last in the all-time Allsvenskan table it is a great achievement for BIK to have played at this level.

In their early years Billingsfors IK participated mainly in the upper divisions of the Swedish football league system but then their fortunes plummeted and in recent decades they have been entrenched in the lower divisions. Since 2012 the club has had no senior team of its own. They played as a combined team with Ärtemarks IF between 2014 and 2020, when Ärtemarks ended the collaboration to focus on developing its own teams.

Now they have youth section with a boys 10 team who plays in a serie. They play their home matches at the Lövåsvallen stadium in Billingsfors.

Billingsfors IK are affiliated to the Dalslands Fotbollförbund.

Season to season

In their early history Billingsfors IK competed in the following divisions:

In recent seasons Billingsfors IK have competed in the following divisions:

Achievements
Allsvenskan:
Best placement (12th): 1946–47

Attendances

In recent seasons Billingsfors IK have had the following average attendances:

On 30 May 2006 a strengthened Billingsfors IK played GAIS in a jubilee match to celebrate BIK's 100-year anniversary in 2006. The match was a great spectacle with almost 850 paying spectators at the Lövåsvallen.

Players
  Ingvar Rydell – Played for Billingsfors IK when the team played in the Allsvenskan. He then went to Malmö FF and was the Allsvenskan top-scorer in the 1949–50 season. He also played in the Swedish national team.

Footnotes

External links
 Billingsfors IK – Official Website 

Football clubs in Västra Götaland County
Association football clubs established in 1906
1906 establishments in Sweden